Mictopsichia cubae is a species of moth of the family Tortricidae. It is found in Cuba.

The wingspan is about 12 mm. The ground colour of the forewings is pale brownish with brown markings. The hindwings are orange.

Etymology
The name refers to the country of origin.

References

Moths described in 2009
Mictopsichia
Moths of Cuba
Taxa named by Józef Razowski
Endemic fauna of Cuba